Rukmini Laxmipathi (also spelled as Rukmani Lakshmipathi, ; 6 December 1892 – 6 August 1951) was an Indian independence activist and politician belonging to the Indian National Congress. She was the first woman to be elected to the Madras Legislature and the first to serve as a minister in the Madras Presidency.

Biography

Rukmini was born in Madras in an agriculturist family. Her grandfather was the landlord Raja T. Ramrao. She obtained her B.A from the Women's Christian College, Madras and married Dr. Achanta Laxmipathi.

In 1923, she joined the Congress. In 1926, she attended the International Women's Suffrage Alliance Congress at Paris as the Indian representative.

For her participation (in 1930) in the Salt Satyagraha in Vedaranyam she was jailed for a year, becoming the first female prisoner in the Salt Satyagraha movement.

She contested and won a by election to the Madras Legislative Council in 1934. She was elected to the Madras Presidency Legislative Assembly in the 1937 elections. On 15 July 1937 she was elected as the Deputy Speaker of the assembly. During 1 May 1946 – 23 March 1947, she was the Minister for Public Health of the presidency in the T. Prakasam cabinet. She was the first (and only) woman minister of the presidency.

Marshall's road in Egmore, Chennai has been renamed after her. In her memory, a postage stamp was issued in 1997.

References 

Indian independence activists from Tamil Nadu
Politicians from Chennai
Indian National Congress politicians from Tamil Nadu
1892 births
1951 deaths
Tamil Nadu ministers
20th-century Indian politicians
Indian tax resisters